Dextranomer (trade name Debrisan, Exudex) is a cicatrizant used in dressings for wound healing, and in pharmaceutical products to treat fecal incontinence.  It consists of dextran polymer chains cross-linked into a three-dimensional network.

Solesta
Solesta is the marketed brand name of a system of injections of dextranomer in stabilized sodium hyaluronate for use in fecal incontinence (FI).  This preparation is a biocompatible gel, for use as a perianal injectable bulking agent. The system is intended to be injected in the submucosal layer of the proximal anal canal (i.e. above the level of the dentate line).

References

External links
 

Dermatologic drugs
Organic polymers